Tan Soo Khoon (born 1 September 1949) is a Singaporean former politician who served as Speaker of the Parliament of Singapore between 1989 and 2001.

Education 
Tan attended the Anglo-Chinese School before graduating from the University of Singapore (now the National University of Singapore) in 1971 with an honours degree in business administration.

He also served as the general secretary of the students' union of the University of Singapore (now the National University of Singapore) in 1969.

Political career
Tan started assisting in the Kuo Chuan constituency in 1971, where he learned about the needs of the working-class in Singapore society. 

It is his strong desire for social equality and improving the lives of the less fortunate that has made his parliamentary speeches well known amongst his fellow MPs. 

Tan took a 13-year break from speech-making when he became speaker. He is remembered for his fairness to both sides of the floor of the house, allowing members of both the governing party and the opposition to speak their minds. He is also remembered for his sense of humor, for his notes to fellow MPs would be signed off "The Watchman", a take on his private business, and his role as speaker.

During his stint as the speaker, he was also president of the AIPO (ASEAN Inter-Parliamentary Organization) for the 1989–1990, 1994–1995 and 1999–2000 sessions. He also served as acting president of Singapore on a number of occasions when the president and deputy prime minister were both out of the country on official business.

Tan also supervised the building of the new Parliament House, heading the Committee on the Parliament Complex Development Project. The new building was completed in 1999, and a ceremony was conducted to officiate the "move" from the old Parliament House near the Supreme Court to the new one along the Singapore River.

In April 2002, when he stepped down as speaker after 13 years, Tan immediately made it known that as a backbencher, with his brutal honesty and openness, he could still "shake the House". Many of his speeches provided witty, pointed, even scathing, remarks about certain government policies and expenditures, such as the extravagance of certain public buildings and the rising cost of public transportation. 

In a tribute by Prime Minister Lee Hsien Loong on 15 April 2006, he said of Tan, "He makes very good speeches in Parliament. Sometimes, he draws blood... Sometimes he has offended ministers, but he has spoken his mind."

Personal life 
Tan's maternal grandfather is Lee Wee Nam, born 1880, who was one of the most prominent Teochew Chinese figures in Singapore's history. Lee was the founder of Lee Hiok Kee Pte Ltd and chairman of the Four Seas Communications Bank.

References

1949 births
Singaporean people of Chinese descent
Anglo-Chinese School alumni
Living people
Members of the Parliament of Singapore
People's Action Party politicians
Singaporean people of Teochew descent
Speakers of the Parliament of Singapore
University of Singapore alumni